Melphina statira, the white-spotted forest swift, is a butterfly in the family Hesperiidae. It is found in Sierra Leone, Ivory Coast, Ghana, Nigeria and Gabon. The habitat consists of forests, including mature secondary forests.

References

Butterflies described in 1891
Erionotini
Butterflies of Africa